Dan Bramall is the name of:

Dan Bramall (athlete) (born 1985), British T33 athlete
Dan Bramall (footballer) (born 1998), English footballer